A servant is a person working within an employer's household.

Servant or servants may refer to:

Places
 Servant, Puy-de-Dôme, France

Arts, entertainment, and media

Films
 The Servant (1963 film), a British drama
 The Servant (1989 film), a Soviet drama
 The Servant (2010 film), a South Korean film

Music
 Servant (band), a Canadian Christian rock group
 The Servant (band), an alternative rock band based in London, England
 The Servant (album), a 2004 album by The Servant
 The Servants, an indie pop band in Hayes, Middlesex, England

Other arts, entertainment, and media
 Servant, a 1948 novel by Robin Maugham
Servants (TV series), a 2003 costume drama by Tim Whitby
Servant (TV series), a 2019 psychological horror web series by M. Night Shyamalan

Computing and technology
 Servant (CORBA), a standard in cross-platform software
 Servant (design pattern), a software design pattern

See also
 Civil servant, a person worked in civil service
 Faithless servant, a legal doctrine